Bifascioides leucomelanella is a moth in the family Cosmopterigidae. It is found in Libya, Egypt and on Malta. It has also been recorded from Sudan, Iran, Saudi Arabia and the United Arab Emirates.

The wingspan is 6–7 mm. Adults have been recorded in February and from May to the end of August. There is probably more than one generation per year.

References

Moths described in 1916
Chrysopeleiinae
Moths of Africa
Moths of Asia